The 1922 King Alexander's Cup was the first edition of the Friendship Cup. It was a single-game tournament in 1922 and the first official match of the national association football team of Romania.

Pre-match
The trophy was named after Alexander I, the King of Yugoslavia. The match was organized to celebrate the wedding of King Alexander I of Yugoslavia with the Princess Maria of Romania, the event being announced by the Romanian newspaper, Ecoul Sportiv on 28 May 1922: "On the occasion of the marriage of His Majesty King Alexander I with Her Royal Highness Princess Maria of Romania, His Majesty was pleased to donate a cup that will bear his name, to encourage the progress of the football-association sport in his country and in the country of his wife. This cup will be a challenge and will go definitely to the country which will win it three times in a row or five times in total." The game took place at Stadion SK Jugoslavija in Belgrade, Kingdom of SCS (today part of Serbia), and ended with a 2–1 win for Romania. Three kings were at the game: Alexander I of Yugoslavia, Ferdinand I of Romania and George II of Greece. Romania's equipment for that match was bought by one of its players, Elemer Hirsch and it was black and white, it is believed that the reason those colors were chosen is that Hirsch was a fan of Universitatea Cluj who had the same colors.

Match

Post-match
The Romanian newspaper, Ecoul Sportiv wrote after the game: "The Romanian representative team wins the Golden Cup of His Majesty King Alexander, beating Jugo-Slavia 2–1. King Alexander's Cup will be exhibited for a week in Bucharest and then it will be sent to Transylvania to be seen by all sportsmen". Ecoul Sportiv also wrote: "The game of the Romanian national team was a true masterpiece, all the players without exception were good, they combined beautifully with a lot of precision, no shot was taken without thought". The Yugoslavian newspaper, Politika wrote after the game: "Yesterday's international match between the Kingdom of Romania and the Kingdom of Serbs, Croats and Slovenes, counting for the Cup of His Majesty King Alexander I surprised not only the host players, but the entire sports world, which did not doubt the success of our national team".

References

External links

1922
1922
1921–22 in Yugoslav football
1921–22 in Romanian football
International association football matches
Romania–Yugoslavia relations